The 2018–19 Western Football League season (known as the 2018–19 Toolstation Western Football League for sponsorship reasons) is the 117th in the history of the Western Football League, a football competition in England. Teams are divided into two divisions; the Premier and the First.

The constitution was announced on 25 May 2018.

Premier Division
The Premier Division consists of 20 clubs, the same as last season, after Street and Melksham Town were promoted to Southern League Division One South & West, and Longwell Green Sports and Wells City were relegated to the First Division. Four new clubs joined:

Plymouth Parkway, promoted from the South West Peninsula League.
Roman Glass St George, runners-up in the First Division.
Shortwood United, resigned from the Southern League West Division.
Westbury United, champions of the First Division.

League table

First Division
The First Division consists of 20 clubs, reduced from 22 the previous season, after Roman Glass St George and Westbury United were promoted to the Premier Division, and Almondsbury and Malmesbury Victoria were transferred to the Hellenic League Division One West. Two new clubs joined:

Longwell Green Sports, relegated from the Premier Division.
Wells City, relegated from the Premier Division.

League table

Les Phillips Cup 
Preliminary Round ties were played from 25 September until 2nd October 2018. 16 clubs from the First Division and Premier Division, entered at this stage of the competition.

First Round ties were played from 30 October until 4 November 2019. All remaining clubs from the First Division and Premier Division, entered at this stage of the competition. December

{| class="wikitable" style="width: 600px; background:WhiteSmoke; text-align:center; font-size:90%"
|-
| scope="col" style="width:  5.00%; background:silver;"  | Date
| scope="col" style="width: 36.25%; background:silver;"  | Home team (tier)
| scope="col" style="width: 12.50%; background:silver;"  | Score
| scope="col" style="width: 36.25%; background:silver;"  | Away team (tier)
| scope="col" style="width: 10.00%; background:silver;"  | 
|-
| 30/10/2018
| Welton Rovers (10)
| 1-3
| Bridgwater Town (9)
| -
|-
| 30/10/2018
| Shepton Mallet (9)
| 4-1 
| Shepton Mallet (10)
| 45
|-
| 30/10/2018
| Buckland Athletic (9)
| 3-0
| Longwell Green Sports (10)
| 63
|-
| 30/10/2018
| Brislington F.C (9)
| 4-2
| Warminster Town (10)
| 30
|-
| 30/10/2018
| Bishop Sutton (10)
| 0-2
| Keynsham Town (10)
| 72
|-
| 30/10/2018
| Ashton & Backwell United (10)
| 2-1
| Portishead Town (10)
| 35
|-
| 30/10/2018
| Chipping Sodbury Town (9)
| 5-0
| Shortwood United (9)
| 45
|-
| 30/10/2018
| Cheddar A.F.C. (10)
| 0-5
| Roman Glass St George (9)| 37
|-
| 31/10/2018
| Westbury United (9)
| 0-3
| Odd Down (Bath) (9)
| -
|-
| 30/10/2018
| Wells City (10)
| 2-1
| Bishops Lydeard (10)
| 45
|-
| 30/10/2018
| Chard Town (10)
| 1-2
| Calne Town (10)
| 58
|-
| 07/11/2018
| Cadbury Heath (9)
| 4-3
| Devizes Town (10)
| 48
|-
| 07/11/2018
| Wellington A.F.C (9)
| 0-2
| Willand Rovers (9)
| 59
|-
| 07/11/2018
| Plymouth Parkway(9) 
| 2-0
| Cribbs F.C(9)
| 101
|-
| 07/11/2018
| Clevedon Town (9) | 4-0
| Bridport F.C. (9)
| 78
|-
| 04/12/2018
| Wincanton Town (10)
| 4-1
| Corsham Town (10)
| -
|-
|}Third Round ties were played from 26 November 2019 until 22 January 2020.Quarter Final ties were played from 5 March 2019 until 26 March 2019Semi Final ties were played on 10 April 2019.

The 2018/19 Les Phillips Cup Final was played at a neutral venue. On this occasion, Raleigh Grove was selected. The home of Sherborne Town'''. The tie was played on 6 May 2019.

References
 League tables

External links
 Western League Official Site

2018-19
9